Walk was the historical German name for the town that is since 1920 divided into Valga in Estonia and Valka in Latvia. After 1419 it was the seat of the Landtag of the Livonian Confederation.

See also
List of German exonyms for places in Estonia
List of German exonyms for places in Latvia

References

Livonian Confederation